The Macintosh SE is a personal computer designed, manufactured, and sold by Apple Computer, from March 1987 to October 1990. It marked a significant improvement on the Macintosh Plus design and was introduced by Apple at the same time as the Macintosh II.

The SE retains the same Compact Macintosh form factor as the original Macintosh computer introduced three years earlier and uses the same design language used by the Macintosh II. An enhanced model, the SE/30, was introduced in January 1989; sales of the original SE continued. The Macintosh SE was updated in August 1989 to include a SuperDrive, with this updated version being called the "Macintosh SE FDHD" and later the "Macintosh SE SuperDrive". The Macintosh SE was replaced with the Macintosh Classic, a very similar model which retained the same central processing unit and form factor, but at a lower price point.

Overview 
The Macintosh SE was introduced at the AppleWorld conference in Los Angeles on March 2, 1987.  The "SE" is an initialism for "System Expansion". Its notable new features, compared to its similar predecessor, the Macintosh Plus, were:
 First compact Macintosh with an internal drive bay for a hard disk (originally 20 MB or 40 MB) or a second floppy drive.
 First compact Macintosh that featured an expansion slot.
 First Macintosh to support the Apple Desktop Bus (ADB), previously only available on the Apple IIGS, for keyboard and mouse connections.
 Improved SCSI support, providing faster data throughput (double that of the Macintosh Plus) and a standard 50-pin internal SCSI connector.
 Better reliability and longer life expectancy (15 years of continuous use) due to the addition of a cooling fan.
 25 percent greater speed when accessing RAM, resulting in a lower percentage of CPU time being spent drawing the screen. In practice this results in a 10-20 percent performance improvement.
 Additional fonts and kerning routines in the Toolbox ROM
 Disk First Aid is included on the system disk

The SE and Macintosh II were the first Apple computers since the Apple I to be sold without a keyboard. Instead the customer was offered the choice of the new ADB Apple Keyboard or the Apple Extended Keyboard.

Apple produced ten SEs with transparent cases as prototypes for promotional shots and employees. They are extremely rare and command a premium price for collectors.

Operating system 
The Macintosh SE shipped with System 4.0 and Finder 5.4; this version is specific to this computer. (The Macintosh II, which was announced at the same time but shipped a month later, includes System 4.1 and Finder 5.5.) The README file included with the installation disks for the SE and II is the first place Apple ever used the term "Macintosh System Software", and after 1998 these two versions were retroactively given the name "Macintosh System Software 2.0.1".

Hardware 
Processor: Motorola 68000, 8 MHz, with an 8 MHz system bus and a 16-bit data path

RAM: The SE came with 1 MB of RAM as standard, and is expandable to 4 MB.  The logic board has four 30-pin SIMM slots; memory must be installed in pairs and must be 150 ns or faster.

Video: The built-in 512 × 342 monochrome screen uses 21,888 bytes of main memory as video memory.

Storage: The SE can accommodate either one or two floppy drives, or a floppy drive and a hard drive. After-market brackets were designed to allow the SE to accommodate two floppy drives as well as a hard drive, however it was not a configuration supported by Apple. In addition an external floppy disk drive may also be connected, making the SE the only Macintosh besides the Macintosh Portable which could support three floppy drives, though its increased storage, RAM capacity and optional internal hard drive rendered the external drives less of a necessity than for its predecessors.  Single-floppy SE models also featured a drive-access light in the spot where the second floppy drive would be.  Hard-drive equipped models came with a 20 MB SCSI hard disk.

Battery: Soldered into the logic board is a 3.6 V 1/2AA lithium battery, which must be present in order for basic settings to persist between power cycles.  Macintosh SE machines which have sat for a long time have experienced battery corrosion and leakage, resulting in a damaged case and logic board.

Expansion: A Processor Direct Slot on the logic board allows for expansion cards, such as accelerators, to be installed. The SE can be upgraded to 50 MHz and more than 5 MB with the MicroMac accelerators. In the past other accelerators were also available such as the Sonnet Allegro. Since installing a card required opening the computer's case and exposing the user to high voltages from the internal CRT, Apple recommended that only authorized Apple dealers install the cards; the case was sealed with then-uncommon Torx screws.

Upgrades: After Apple introduced the Macintosh SE/30 in January, 1989, a logic board upgrade was sold by Apple dealers for US$1,699 as a high-cost upgrade for the SE, consisting of a new SE/30 motherboard, case front and internal chassis to accommodate the upgrade components.

ROM/Easter egg: The SE ROM size increased from 64 KB in the original Mac (and 128 KB in the Mac Plus) to 256 KB, which allowed the development team to include an Easter Egg hidden in the ROMs. By jumping to address 0x41D89A (or reading from the ROM chips), it is possible to display four images of the engineering team.

Models 
Introduced March 2, 1987:
 Macintosh SE with 1 MB RAM and two 800k drives
 Macintosh SE 1/20 with 1 MB RAM, one 800k drive and 20 MB hard disk.
Introduced August 1, 1988:
 Macintosh SE 1/40: The same of the Macintosh SE with a 40 MB hard disk in place of 20 MB.
Introduced August 1, 1989:
 Macintosh SE FDHD: Includes the new SuperDrive, a floppy disk drive that can handle 1.4 MB High Density (HD) floppy disks.  FDHD is an acronym for "Floppy Disk High Density"; later some Macintosh SE FDHDs were labeled Macintosh SE SuperDrive, to conform to Apple's marketing change with respect to their new drive. High-density floppies would become the de facto standard on both the Macintosh and PC computers from then on. An upgrade kit was sold for the original Macintosh SE which included new ROM chips and a new disk controller chip, to replace the originals.

Timeline

See also
 Mini vMac

References

External links

 1987 Apple Computer, Inc. promotional video "Own-a-Mac - The Movie"
 The Mac SE Support Pages Repair & upgrade advice. (Wayback Machine Archived Version)
 Mac SE Low End Mac

SE
SE
Computer-related introductions in 1987